USS Momsen (DDG-92) is an  in service with the United States Navy. Momsen is the twenty-sixth destroyer of the Arleigh Burke class to be built by Bath Iron Works. She is named after Vice Admiral Charles B. "Swede" Momsen of Flushing, Queens, New York (1896–1967). Vice Admiral Momsen made many contributions to the navy such as the invention of the Momsen Lung when he was assigned to the Bureau of Construction and Repair. Momsen was also involved in the first successful rescue of a crew of a sunken submarine, and subsequently supervised the salvage of the boat.

Momsens keel was laid on 16 November 2001. She was launched on 19 July 2003, sponsored by Admiral Momsen's daughter, Evelyn Momsen Hailey. Momsen was commissioned on 28 August 2004, at Panama City, Florida.

The construction of Momsen and sister ship , from initial steelcutting to sea trials, was documented on the Discovery Channel television special Destroyer: Forged in Steel. The destroyers were not referenced by name, but their numbers were visible on their prows. As of 2019, Momsen is serving in the Pacific Fleet, homeported in NAVSTA Everett, Washington, and recently assigned to Destroyer Squadron 31 based at Pearl Harbor, Hawaii.

Service history

2006

On 6 April 2006, Momsen departed Naval Station Everett for her maiden deployment. During the six-month cruise, the ship conducted training and operations throughout Southeast Asia and the Western Pacific in the U.S. 7th Fleet area of responsibility. Momsen returned home from a successful maiden deployment on 22 September 2006.

2008
Momsen departed for her second deployment on 14 March 2008 with Carrier Strike Group Nine. During her deployment, Momsen provided critical humanitarian assistance for two foreign vessels, a stranded cargo vessel with engine problems and a former hijacked merchant vessel requiring food, water and medical attention. She returned home on 13 October 2008 after a seven-month underway period.

2010-2011

Momsen departed for her third deployment September 2010 with Carrier Strike Group Nine. 

On 2 February 2011, Momsen, with the guided-missile cruiser , responded to a distress call from the Panamanian-flag merchant vessel Duqm in the Gulf of Oman. Both ships disrupted a pirate attack on Duqm, tracked the two pirate skiffs back to their mothership, and destroyed the two skiffs to prevent their use in future pirate attacks (pictured).

Controversy
The ship's skipper, Commander Jay Wylie, was relieved of command on 27 April 2011 for "loss of confidence in his ability to command." On 28 October 2011 Wylie pleaded guilty to sexual assault and rape, and was sentenced by court martial to 42 months imprisonment and loss of all navy benefits.

2013
During her 2013 deployment, Momsen initially joined Carrier Strike Group Eleven before undertaking independent operations with the U.S. Seventh Fleet. During this deployment, Momsen participated in such multilateral naval exercises as CARAT Indonesia 2013 in the Java Sea, Talisman Sabre 2013 in the Coral Sea, and SAREX in the Sea of Japan. Momsen operated with Carrier Strike Group Five during the Talisman Sabre and SAREX exercises. Momsen also paid port visits to Indonesia, Japan, Saipan, Australia. On 22 August 2013, Momsen returned to Naval Station Everett, Washington, after a four-month underway period as part of the U.S. Seventh Fleet.

2018
In 2018, Momsen made a port call to Anchorage.

2022
In February 2022, the Momsen departed Everett to begin a pan-Pacific deployment. 23 April 2022, Momsen made a port call to Goa.
 
On November 29, 2022 A webcam overlooking San Diego Bay has captured an apparent near collision between U.S. warships whose crews had to deploy evasive maneuvers. In the footage, crewmen from both ships are heard informing each other that they veering to port, or left, to eliminate the threat of a collision. The Navy, however, is investigating Tuesday’s incident involving the guided-missile destroyer, Momsen, and the landing ship Harpers Ferry, according to the Navy Times.

Awards
 Navy Unit Commendation – (Apr – Sep 2008, Sep 2010 – Mar 2011, Dec 2011 – Aug 2012)
 Battle "E" – (2008, 2013)
 Secretary of the Navy (SECNAV) Energy Conservation Award (Environmental Quality, Small Ship category) – (2010, 2012)

References

External links

USS Momsen official web site
navsource.org: USS Momsen

 

Ships built in Bath, Maine
Arleigh Burke-class destroyers
Destroyers of the United States
2003 ships